Rhema is the second extended play by the Christian metal band War of Ages (the first recorded under that moniker, as the prior EP, Unite Us All, was created under the band’s former name Point Zero). It was released on October 29th, 2021, and is the final recording of the band's drummer Kaleb Leubchow before his death in July 2022. The EP was produced by the band's guitarist, Jack Daniels.

Track listing

Personnel
Credits adapted from liner notes.
War of Ages
 Leroy Hamp – vocals
 Steve Brown – guitar
 Jack Daniels – guitar, production, engineering, mixing
 Elisha Mullins – bass, backing vocals
 Kaleb Leubchow – drums

Additional personnel
 John Dougless – mastering
 Justin Aufdemkampe – additional vocal tracking

References

War of Ages albums
Facedown Records albums